This is a list of Military units and formations currently active in the Belgian Land Component.

Headquarters

Infantry

Paracommando Units

Special Forces

Reconnaissance and Armoured

Artillery

Auxiliary and Support

Schools

External links

Military units and formations of Belgium
Belgian military-related lists